This article lists the prime ministers of Guinea-Bissau, since the establishment of the office of prime minister in 1973.

Since Guinea-Bissau's declaration of independence from Portugal on 24 September 1974, there have been twenty prime ministers and two acting prime ministers. The current holder of the office is Nuno Gomes Nabiam, who was appointed by a decree of president Umaro Sissoco Embaló on 28 February 2020.

List of officeholders
Political parties

Other factions

Symbols

Notes

Timeline

See also

 Politics of Guinea-Bissau
 List of captains-major of Bissau
 List of captains-major of Cacheu
 List of governors of Portuguese Guinea
 List of presidents of Guinea-Bissau
 Vice President of Guinea-Bissau

External links
 World Statesmen – Guinea-Bissau

Government of Guinea-Bissau
 
Guinea-Bissau
Guinea-Bissau politics-related lists